Bill C-14 refers to various legislation introduced into the House of Commons of Canada, including:

 Foreign Extraterritorial Measures Act, introduced in 1984 to the first session of the 33rd Parliament
 Canada Transportation Act, establishing the Canadian Transportation Agency, introduced in 1996 to the second session of the 35th Parliament
 An Act to amend the Criminal Code and to make related amendments to other Acts (medical assistance in dying), introduced in 2016 to the only session of the 42nd Parliament
 Preserving Provincial Representation in the House of Commons Act, introduced in 2022 to the first session of the 44th Parliament

Canadian federal legislation